Oliver James Hart (July 18, 1892 - May 4, 1978) was a priest who was elected as coadjutor bishop of the Episcopal Diocese of Pennsylvania, serving as diocesan from 1943 to 1963.

Early life and education
Oliver James Hart was born on July 18, 1892 in York, South Carolina.  He graduated from Hobart College in 1913, and earned an S.T.B. from General Theological Seminary in 1916.  He would later earn a B.D. from Union Seminary, a LL.D from Hobart College and a D.D. from the University of the South and the University of Chattanooga.

Career
He was ordained a deacon by Bishop Charles Sumner Burch, Suffragan of New York, in 1916 and then to the priesthood ion June 20, 1917 by Bishop William A. Guerry of South Carolina. He was curate of St. Michael's Church, Charleston, South Carolina that same year.  He served as a chaplain during the First World War, becoming chaplain of the First Division.  He returned to St. Michael's in 1919 as an assistant minister. From 1920 to 1926 he served at Christ Church, Macon, Georgia.  From 1926 to 1934 he served at St. Paul's Church in Chattanooga, Tennessee. He became the rector of St. John's Church, Washington D.C. in 1934 and continued there until 1940.  During that time he declined election as Bishop Coadjutor of the Diocese of Tennessee and then declined election as Bishop Coadjutor of the Diocese of Central New York.

In 1940 he became rector of Trinity Church, Boston.  In February 1942 he asked for, and was granted, a leave to serve again as a chaplain in the United States Army.  He served as a captain in the Army Chaplains Corps, and was stationed at Fort Dix, New Jersey. He was released from his chaplaincy in October when he was consecrated as the Bishop Coadjutor of the Diocese of Pennsylvania.  He would become the Diocesan Bishop in July, 1943 after the death of the Rt. Rev. Francis M. Taitt.

Death and legacy
Upon retiring he and Mrs. Hart had made their home in Castine, Me.  Bishop Hart suffered injuries in a fall on April 22, 1978. He would die from complications of the fall on May 4, 1978 at Orange Memorial Hospital, Orange, N.J.

References 
 Retired Bishop Hart of Pennsylvania Dies
 The Living Church Annual 1943, Morehouse-Gorham, CO., New York, NY, 1942. Page 70

1978 deaths
1892 births
20th-century American Episcopalians
Episcopal bishops of Pennsylvania